Kino was a Soviet rock-band formed in Leningrad, Soviet Union. The original band, known as "Garin i Giperboloidy" (Garin & The Hyperboloids), after Aleksey Nikolayevich Tolstoy's novel The Hyperboloid of Engineer Garin, was formed in 1981 by Viktor Tsoi, along with Aleksei Rybin and Oleg Valinskiy. One year later they formed the group "Kino", which included  Tsoi, Yuri Kasparyan, Igor Tikhomirov, and Georgiy Guryanov.

Albums

Studio albums

Compilations and demos

Live albums

References

External links 
 

Discography
Discographies of Russian artists
Punk rock group discographies
New wave music